Lieutenant-General John Lindsay, 20th Earl of Crawford (4 October 1702 – 25 December 1749) was a Scottish peer and the first colonel of the Black Watch on its formation in 1739.

Biography
Lindsay was the son of Lieutenant-General John Lindsay, 19th Earl of Crawford and Emilia Stuart and inherited his titles on the death of his father in 1714.
He was educated at University of Glasgow and the Vaudeuil Military Academy, Paris.

The Earl of Crawford was commissioned into the 3rd Foot Guards in 1726, but later served in the Austrian and Russian armies. In the summer of 1739, during the Battle of Grocka (part of Siege of Belgrade), he was badly wounded by a bullet to his thigh and was almost abandoned for dead on the battlefield. However, after partial recovery and against advice, he travelled back to Vienna, and onward to Britain, where he took command of the Black Watch (1739–1740).

He was then Colonel of the 2nd Troop of Horse Grenadier Guards (1740–1743) and Colonel of the 4th Troop of Horse Guards ('Scottish Horse Guards') (1743–1746), fighting at the Battle of Dettingen on 16 June 1743. He gained the rank of Brigadier-General in 1744 and Major-General in 1745. He fought in the Jacobite rising of 1745 and the Battle of Fontenoy on 30 April 1745.

Crawford was Colonel of the 25th Foot (1746–1747). He fought in the Battle of Rocoux on 11 October 1746 and gained the rank of Lieutenant-General in 1747. He was Colonel of the 2nd Dragoons ('Scots Greys') (1747–1749)

In 1732 Crawford was elected a Fellow of the Royal Society. In 1734 he was Grand Master of the Premier Grand Lodge of England.

Family
Crawford married Lady Jean Murray, daughter of Lieutenant-General Sir James Murray, 2nd Duke of Atholl, in 1747, but she died only nine months after their marriage. He died on 26 December 1749, from a leg wound received at the Battle of Krotzka in 1739.  He was the last member of the Lindsay family to be buried in the mausoleum in the cemetery at Ceres, Fife, Scotland.

He was half brother (through a common mother, Lady Emelia Stuart, Countess of Crawford) to the law lord Alexander Fraser, Lord Strichen.

Notes

Bibliography 

 

|-

|-

|-

|-

|-

1702 births
1749 deaths
42nd Regiment of Foot officers
British Army lieutenant generals
British Life Guards officers
20
Royal Scots Greys officers
Scots Guards officers
Fellows of the Royal Society
Scottish representative peers
John
Freemasons of the Premier Grand Lodge of England
Grand Masters of the Premier Grand Lodge of England
Lindsay, John Lindsay, 4th Earl of